The 1967 All-Ireland Senior Football Championship was the 81st staging of the All-Ireland Senior Football Championship, the Gaelic Athletic Association's premier inter-county Gaelic football tournament. The championship began on 23 April 1967 and ended on 24 September 1967.

Galway entered the championship as the defending champions, however, they were defeated by Mayo in the Connacht semi-final.

On 24 September 1967, Meath won the championship following a 1-9 to 0-9 defeat of Cork in the All-Ireland final. This was their third All-Ireland title and their first in thirteen championship seasons.

Cavan's Charlie Gallagher was the championship's top scorer with 1-25. Meath's Bertie Cunningham was the choice for Texaco Footballer of the Year.

Leinster Championship format change

Second round returns to Leinster this year.

Results

Connacht Senior Football Championship

Quarter-final

Semi-finals

Final

Leinster Senior Football Championship

First round

Second round

Quarter-finals

Semi-finals

Final

Munster Senior Football Championship

Quarter-finals

Semi-finals

Final

Ulster Senior Football Championship

Preliminary round

Quarter-finals

Semi-finals

Final

All-Ireland Senior Football Championship

Semi-finals

Final

Championship statistics

Miscellaneous

 The Limerick vs Tipperary game was the first meeting between the teams since 1952. The match gave Limerick a first win over Tipperary since 1896.
 Mayo won the Connacht championship for the first time since 1955.
 The All Ireland final was the first championship meeting between Meath and Cork.

Top scorers

Overall

Single game

References